Telphusa penetratrix is a moth of the family Gelechiidae. It is found in Paraguay.

References

Moths described in 1931
Telphusa
Taxa named by Edward Meyrick